Ankit Raj is an Indian television and film actor and model. He has played a variety of characters in different television shows like Qubool Hai, Ishqbaaaz and Laado 2 – Veerpur Ki Mardaani.

Career
Raj has made his footprints in the fashion world by walking for leading designers such as Manish Malhotra, Rohit Bal, Troy Costa, Wendell Rodricks, Karan Johar, Varun Bahl, and Tarun Tahiliani to name a few. He has been the pool model for Van Heusen for two seasons and has been on the cover of Wills Fashion magazine 2009. Colotmate, Sprite, Honda Jazz, Yamaha FZ, Peter England, Reebok, World player shirts, Kaiser Josh are some of the brands that Raj have been associated with in his fashion career. In 2014, he played the role of Goldie in the film Karle Pyaar Karle. Taran Adarsh of Bollywood Hungama, wrote of his performance "a few fill the bill Aham Sharma and Ankit Ra" Raj was felicitated at the Asia Model Festival 2015 for his contribution to the modelling industry. In 2015, Raj made his debut to Indian television with Zee TV's Qubool Hai as Amaad Iqbaal Khan. In 2017, he appeared in the cameo role of Samar in Star Plus's series Ishqbaaaz'' alongside Additi Gupta.

Filmography

Television

Films

References

External links
 
 

Living people
People from Jabalpur
21st-century Indian male actors
Indian male film actors
Indian male television actors
Male actors in Hindi cinema
Indian male models
1988 births